Blu celeste is the debut studio album by Italian singer Blanco. The album was produced by Michelangelo and released on 10 September 2021 by Universal.

The album peaked at number 1 of FIMI's album chart and was certified sextuple platinum in Italy.

Track listing

Charts

Weekly charts

Year-end charts

Certifications

Year-end lists

References

Blanco (singer) albums
2021 albums